Tata Castle, built at the mid 14th-century on the northern tip of Lake Öreg (Old Lake), is one of the jewels of Tata, Hungary. Its blooming can be dated to the reign of Sigismund of Luxembourg (r. 1433–1437) and Mátyás Hunyadi (r. 1458–1490) as the summer resort of the king and a favoured residence. It was burnt by Habsburgs and later renovated. The walls of the castle reflect the marks of romantic style which is due to the Esterházy family who used to live here.

In popular culture
Parts of the Bollywood film Raabta (2017) and The Witcher were shot at the castle.

References

External link

Castles in Hungary
Buildings and structures in Komárom-Esztergom County
Tourist attractions in Komárom-Esztergom County
14th-century establishments in Hungary